Claudio Randrianantoanina (born 28 July 1987 in Paris 15è) is a football player. He does not currently have  a club. Born in France, he represented Madagascar at international level.

He is the younger brother of Marco.

External links

1987 births
Living people
Footballers from Paris
People with acquired Malagasy citizenship
Malagasy footballers
Madagascar international footballers
Association football midfielders
US Créteil-Lusitanos players
French sportspeople of Malagasy descent
French footballers